Dustin A. Richardson (born January 9, 1984) is an American professional baseball pitcher who is a free agent. He has previously played for the Boston Red Sox in Major League Baseball. Richardson also pitched for the Toronto Maple Leafs of the Intercounty Baseball League, comprising teams made up from southwestern Ontario.

Career

Amateur career
Richardson attended Newton High School in Newton, Kansas, and then went to Cowley County Community College and Texas Tech University.

Boston Red Sox
Richardson was drafted in the fifth round of the 2006 Major League Baseball draft by the Boston Red Sox, and made his professional debut for the Lowell Spinners that year. He spent the majority of the 2008 season on the roster of the Portland Sea Dogs of the Eastern League, and was invited to his first Major League spring training in 2009.

Richardson made his MLB debut with 1.1 innings of scoreless relief against the Toronto Blue Jays on September 28, 2009. He pitched in three games in 2009 and 26 in 2010 for the Red Sox, with a 4.15 ERA.

Florida Marlins
On November 12, 2010, Richardson was traded to the Florida Marlins in exchange for Andrew Miller. He appeared in 23 games for the AAA New Orleans Zephyrs with a 3.66 ERA. He was designated for assignment on June 17, 2011.

Atlanta Braves
Richardson was claimed off waivers by the Atlanta Braves on June 22 and was assigned to the Triple-A Gwinnett Braves, where he had a 6.00 ERA in 23 games. He was released on January 6, 2012.

On January 25, 2012, Major League Baseball announced that, effective upon his signing by a major league team, Richardson would be suspended for 50 games for violating MLB's drug policy, having tested positive for amphetamine, Letrozole, Methandienone, Methenelone, and Trenbolone.

Los Angeles Angels of Anaheim
After beginning the 2013 season with the Sugar Land Skeeters of the Atlantic League of Professional Baseball, Richardson signed a minor league deal with the Los Angeles Angels of Anaheim on June 15, 2013. He was assigned to Triple-A Salt Lake. In 20 games in 2013 he had a 6.47 ERA, and he returned in 2014 to Salt Lake and was 3-3 with a 7.69 ERA in 36 games.

Los Angeles Dodgers
In February 2015, he signed a minor league contract with the Los Angeles Dodgers. He pitched in 14 games in 2015 (with four starts) combined for the AA Tulsa Drillers and AAA Oklahoma City Dodgers and was 2–0 with a 2.08 ERA.

Long Island Ducks
On June 15, 2016, Richardson signed with the Long Island Ducks of the Atlantic League of Professional Baseball. He re-signed on September 8, 2017. He became a free agent after the 2017 season.

York Revolution
On August 20, 2018, Richardson signed with the York Revolution of the Atlantic League of Professional Baseball. He re-signed with the team for the 2019 season. Richardson became a free agent following the 2019 season.

Personal
As part of the television show Knight School, Richardson tried out for the Texas Tech Red Raiders men's basketball team.

References

External links

1984 births
Living people
People from Newton, Kansas
Boston Red Sox players
Major League Baseball pitchers
Baseball players from Kansas
Lowell Spinners players
Lancaster JetHawks players
Greenville Drive players
Portland Sea Dogs players
North Shore Honu players
Navegantes del Magallanes players
American expatriate baseball players in Venezuela
Pawtucket Red Sox players
Mesa Solar Sox players
New Orleans Zephyrs players
Gwinnett Braves players
Sugar Land Skeeters players
Águilas Cibaeñas players
American expatriate baseball players in the Dominican Republic
Cowley Tigers baseball players
Texas Tech Red Raiders baseball players
Salt Lake Bees players
Tulsa Drillers players
Oklahoma City Dodgers players
Long Island Ducks players
York Revolution players
Rochester Honkers players